Ethylhexylglycerin, or octoxyglycerin, is a glyceryl ether that is commonly used as part of a preservative system in cosmetic preparations.

References

Vicinal diols
Glycerol ethers